The Pink Line of Namma Metro is under construction and will form part of the metro rail network for the city of Bangalore, Karnataka, India. The 21.25 km line connects Kalena Agrahara station (previously named Gottigere) on Bannerghatta road in the south with Nagawara station on Outer Ring road in the north. The Pink Line is mostly underground (13.92 km) but also has a 6.98 km elevated section and a 0.48 km at-grade (surface) section. There are 18 stations on the line of which 12 are underground and 6 are elevated. Pink Line will have an interchange with the Purple Line at MG Road station. It will also have interchanges with the Yellow line at Jayadeva Hospital station and with the Blue Line at Nagawara. Both these lines are under construction.

History 
In 2007, as follow up to the Metro Phase that was about to begin construction then, RITES had recommended several mono-rail routes totaling 60 km. These recommendations were made as Government of Karnataka requested a survey of feeder routes for Phase l of metro that was to begin construction. One of the routes was entirely on Bannerghatta Road from Bannerghatta National Park up to its northern end at Hosur Road (near Adugodi). At that stage, Bannerghatta Road was not expected to have high growth and dense population, hence the recommendation for Monorail. However, by 2010 itself, it became apparent that Bannerghatta Road would need a higher capacity system than a monorail. Also, Karnataka government did not favor a monorail system and preferred expansion of the Metro system. Accordingly, for its Phase ll, BMRC had requested DMRC for a DPR for the route between Bannerghatta to Yelahanka via:

 Jayadeva Underpass, Hosur Road, Brigade Road, MG Road,
 Kamaraj Road, Tannery Road, Nagavara Junction (along Outer Ring Road), Sahakara Nagar, Vidyaranyapura to Yelahanka.
 Jayamahal Extension, RT Nagar, Nagavara Junction (along Outer Ring Road), Sahakara Nagar to Yelahanka.

The DPR had noted that the Metro Alignment may have to go underground after Jayadeva flyover (along Bannerghatta Road) up to Nagawara junction (along Outer Ring Road). The remaining portion could be elevated.

Planning
Since there were plans for a line along Outer Ring Road and also the possibility that a link to Airport may have to be routed along Airport Road (passing Yelahanka), BMRC opted to terminate the Pink Line in Phase ll at Nagawara.

Land requirement was estimated at around 50 hectares and Karnataka Industrial Area Development Board (KIADB) was tasked with acquiring land on behalf of BMRC. A total of 690 trees were to be cut to build the line (438 trees for the elevated section and 252 trees for the underground stretch).

On 14 July 2017, BMRC unveiled the alignment of the 13.92 km underground section of the line. The alignment included a modification from the original plan - Cantonment metro station had been proposed to be constructed on Indian Railways land next to Cantonment railway station. Due to technicalities (steep gradient between Shivajinagar and Cantonment, sharp curve past the old location of Cantonment Station, construction below built-up structures, difficulty acquiring land and very high costs of demolishing several properties in the area), BMRC opted to shift Cantonment Metro Station. Cantonment Metro Station would instead be built under a playground belonging to Bruhat Bengaluru Mahanagara Palike (BBMP), near Bamboo Bazaar.

This was resented by sections of the public as the new location would be further away from the entrance of Cantonment station. SWR is however planning new suburban platforms on railways land that is towards the Metro station. A skywalk or pedestrian subway is being planned to connect the Metro station to Cantonment Railway Station.

The MG Road station on the Pink Line is to be located under Kamaraj Road and will serve as an interchange station with the Purple Line.

Tendering
Due to long underground section with tunneling in difficult geology, the cost of the Pink Line was expected to be high. BMRC initially floated tenders for the construction of the 13.9 km underground section in four packages during June 2017. However, all bids received were too high (nearly 70% higher).

Since bids were too high, all tenders for the underground section had been canceled by BMRC on 26 March 2018. There was speculation of collusion as bids were similar and each bidder had quoted lowest for one package, thus all four might get to be awarded one package each.

The second round of tendering resulted in bids that were closer to estimates by BMRC and were awarded to three firms during February–November period, 2019. One of the firms (L&T) won two bids. The total awarded tunneling tenders for the underground sections was ₹5,925.95 crores (appx US$812 million).

Construction 
Elevated Section

In March 2017, BMRC had floated tender for construction of the 7.5 km elevated section between Kalena Agrahara (previously Gottigere) and Tavarekere (previously Swagat Cross) stations for construction of the elevated section of Pink Line with viaduct, five stations and depot entry line to Kothanur depot. The tender was awarded to Simplex Constructions for 578.70 crores on 8 September 2017.

Due to very slow progress by Simplex, their tender was canceled and a fresh tender was called for the remaining works in February 2021. GR Infra was the lowest bidder and the tender was awarded to them in July, 2021.

Underground Section

Pre-tunneling construction work and piling for stations began in May 2019 by L&T. Tunnel boring using TBMs began in August–September 2020 by L&T with two TBMs. L&T uses four TBMs named Urja, Avni, Vindhya and Lavi. Two TBMs (Avni and Lavi) are used for tunnel boring southwards from Shivajinagar towards Rashtriya Military School. The other two TBMs (Urja and Vindhya) are used for boring southwards from Cantonment to Shivajinagar after which they will be shifted back to Cantonment to bore tunnels northwards towards Tannery road.

Tunnel boring work by Afcons with three TBMs (Varada, Rudra and Vamika) on the section between Rashtriya Military School and Dairy Circle began during March–June 2021 period.

ITD-Cem began tunnel works during June–August 2021 period on the Venkateshpura-Nagawara section.

Funding
In May 2017, BMRC received in-principle approval from the European Investment Bank (EIB) to fund construction of the Kalena Agrahara-Nagawara line through a  loan. The line will also be funded by the Central and State Governments.

Stations
The Pink Line will have 18 stations, of which 12 are underground and 6 are elevated.

See also 

 Namma Metro
 Purple Line
 Green Line
 Yellow Line
 Blue Line
Orange Line
 List of Namma Metro Stations
 Rapid transit in India
 List of metro systems

References

Namma Metro lines